Budgam district is a district in the Indian union territory of Jammu and Kashmir. Created in 1979 with its headquarters at the town of Budgam, it is the district with the largest population of Shia Muslims in the Kashmir valley.

Administration
Budgam district is the closest district to the union territory capital Srinagar (11 km). Budgam district came into existence in 1979, prior to which it was part of Srinagar district. In former times, Budgam was a part of Baramulla district, when Srinagar itself was a constituent of the Anantnag district. It was then known as tehsil Sri Pratap. Historical records suggests that Budgam was also referred to as Pargana Deesu. According to the well-known chronicler Khawaja Azam Demari, the area was also known as Deedmarbag. Budgam district borders the districts of Baramullah and Srinagar in the north, Pulwama in the south and Poonch in the south west. 

In 2008, Budgam district consisted of eight blocks. Currently, the district consists of seventeen blocks: Beerwah, Budgam, B.K.Pora, Chadoora, Charari Sharief, Khag, Khansahib, Nagam, Narbal, Pakherpora, Parnewa, Rathsoon, Soibugh, Sukhnag, Surasyar, S.K.Pora and Waterhail. Each block consists of a number of panchayats. 

The district is subdivided into the nine tehsils of Charari Sharief Tehsil, Magam tehsil, Beerwah Tehsil, Budgam Tehsil, Chadoora Tehsil,  Khansahib Tehsil, Khag Tehsil, BK Pora Tehsil and Narbal Tehsil.

Other details

Demographics

According to the 2011 census Budgam district has a population of 735,753 roughly equal to the nation of Guyana or the US state of Alaska, making it 494th in India (out of a total of 640). Its population growth rate over the decade 2001-2011 was 24.14%. Badgam has a sex ratio of 883 females for every 1000 males, and a literacy rate of 56.08% (males 66.30%, females 44.85%), an increase from 42.20% (males 53.13%, females 30.29%) in 2001. Literacy is higher in urban areas (average 68.87%, male 79.46%, female 55.38%) than in rural areas (average 54.01%, male 64.00%, female 43.29%).

At the time of the 2011 Census of India, 94.78% of the population in the district spoke Kashmiri and 3.01% Gojri as their first language.

Shias form 20% of Budgam district's population; almost 90% of the urban population of the district are Shia, whilst the majority of the rural population of the district are Sunni.

Education 
There are 590 schools in Budgam, both private and public, 33 of which are Higher Secondary Schools.
Arath Budgam is the second largest village of Budgam District. Ever Green Public Model School Arath is the most popular school in this village.(There are qualified teachers in this school. Some of them are Tanveer Ahmad Rather(Arath) , Nisar Ahmad Rather(Arath) , Bilal Ahamad Dar(Russu), etc. as on 16 Feb 2023.) 

There are 590 schools in Budgam, both private and public, 33 of which are Higher Secondary Schools.↵There are 6 Government Degree Colleges at;

 Government Degree College Beerwah
 Government Degree College Khansahib
 Government Degree College Magam 
 Sheikh ul Aalam Memorial Degree College Budgam
 Model Degree College Chrar e Sharif
 Government Degree College chadoora.

Railways 
Budgam district has three railway stations: Budgam, Nadigam and Mazhom, which are all on the Jammu–Baramulla line.

It is the biggest railway station in Kashmir division. This railway station has the administrative head controlling the rail service in the Kashmir valley.

Health care 
Budgam mainly rely on the Hospitals of Capital City Of Srinagar But Contain One District Hospital In Budgam City One Sub District Hospitals respectively in Beerwah , Khan Sahib, Magam, Chadoora.Outside Budgam railway station, there is a big hospital, named Ibn-Sina Hospital, which is Budgam district's first private hospital.

Attractions

Budgam contains the only airport in Kashmir valley at Ichgam. The district's main tourist attractions are Doodhpathri, Yusmarg, Tosamaidan, Nilnag, Khag and Pehjan. District Budgam offers many stunning locales and has tremendous
tourism potential that has largely remained untapped so far. The attractive places that can be visited are
Doodhpathri, Yousmarg, Tosamaidan,
Nilnag and Khag.
Kani Shawl adomed the caesar's court and was looked upon by Mughals and later by Nawabs as mark of nobility. In 1776, Napoleon Bonaparte presented a Kani shawl to his wife Josephine and with that took off a new fashion trend in Europe.
The revered shrine of Sheikh Noor-ud-din Wali can also be found in the Charari Sharief Tehsil of Budgam district. Asia's oldest/largest Chinar resides at Chattergam Budgam. Aga Sahib Shrine and Tomb of Shams-ud-Din Araqi are also situated in this district.

Notable people

  Nund Rishi,
  Shamas Faqir,
 Ghulam Nabi Gowhar
 Samad Mir,
 Aga Syed Yusuf Al-Moosavi Al-Safavi,
 Mir Shams-ud-Din Araqi
 Aga Syed Mohammad Fazlullah
 Aga Mir Syed Mohammad Baqir Mosavi
 Aga Syed Mustafa Al-Moosavi
 Aga Syed Mehdi
 Aga Syed Mohsin

See also 
 Kupwara district
 Ganderbal district
 Anantnag district
 Pulwama district

References

External links
 Official website of Budgam district
 Risingkashmir.in 
 Greaterkashmir.com
 Kashmirtimes.com
 Kashmirwatch.com
 Kashmirmonitor.org
 Taghribnews.com

 
Districts of Jammu and Kashmir
Minority Concentrated Districts in India
1979 establishments in Jammu and Kashmir